Jack L. Stark was president of Claremont McKenna College in Claremont, California from 1970 to 1999. He followed the short-lived tenure of CMC's second president, Howard R. Neville (1969-1970), being followed himself by CMC's fourth and fifth presidents, Pamela Brooks Gann (1999-2013) and Hiram E. Chodosh (2013 - ) .  At the time of his retirement, Stark was the longest serving college president in the state of California.

Stark was himself a 1957 graduate of CMC, later joining the U.S. Marine Corps before returning to CMC as director of alumni relations.  He was eventually chosen as assistant to founding president George C. S. Benson. In 1970 he was chosen as acting president.

Stark continues to serve on the CMC Board of Trustees as a life trustee.  His contributions to the college are remembered through the Jack L. Stark Distinguished Service Award, given in recognition of outstanding service to the College, the Alumni Association and to the Alumni of Claremont McKenna College and the Jack L. Stark society, a gift club level for CMC donors. Stark Hall, Claremont McKenna's substance-free residence hall, is also named in his honor.

Heads of universities and colleges in the United States
Claremont McKenna College alumni
Living people
Year of birth missing (living people)